Barbara Flerow-Bułhak (unknown – unknown) was a Polish chess master. She was a Women's World Chess Championship participant (1937).

Biography
Barbara Flerow-Bułhak participated in the first two finals of the Polish Women's Chess Championship. In 1935, she ranked 7th place, while in 1937 Barbara Flerow-Bułhak won the title of Polish Women's Chess vice-champion (both finals were played in Warsaw). Also she participated in the Warsaw Women's Chess Championship twice, where in 1936 she ranked 2nd place, and in 1937 she shared together with Regina Gerlecka 1st – 2nd place.

In 1937 in Stockholm she participated in the Women's World Chess Championship and shared 17th - 20th place (tournament won by Vera Menchik).

References

External links
Barbara Flerow-Bułhak at szachypolskie.pl

Year of birth missing
Year of death missing
Polish female chess players